The Umweltbundesamt (UBA) is the German Environment Agency.  Together with the Bundesamt für Naturschutz, the Bundesamt für kerntechnische Entsorgungssicherheit and the Bundesamt für Strahlenschutz, it operates under the jurisdiction of the Federal Ministry of the Environment, Nature Conservation, and Nuclear Safety. The tasks of the office are primarily "the scientific support of the Federal Government (including the Federal Ministeries for the Environment, Health, Economy and Climate Protection, Education and Research, Transport and Digital Infrastructure), the implementation of environmental laws (e.g. emission rights trade, admission of chemicals, medicinal and pesticides) and the public information on environmental protection" based on independent research. With around 1,600 employees, the German Federal Environment Agency is the largest environmental authority in Europe.

History 
In autumn 1969 Willy Brandt became the first SPD Federal Chancellor of the Federal Republic; He formed a social -liberal coalition (Kabinett Brandt I or 1972 Kabinett Brandt II). Brandt had already called for a "blue sky above the Ruhr area" at his first candidacy for chancellor (for the 1961 Bundestag election).

As early as the early 1970s, the FDP politician and then Interior Minister Hans-Dietrich Genscher called for the creation of an environmental authority to analogously existing authorities in the US and Sweden. Against the resistance, especially of the Ministry of Health and Science, which feared a loss of competence in the field of environmental protection, the Federal Office of Environmental Affairs was created in 1973 and on July 22, 1974, to the Federal Environment Agency by "Law on the establishment of a Federal Minister of Environment" in the Federal Minister converted of the interior, as an independent Federal Ober authority based in Berlin. The decision of the German Bundestag of June 19, 1974, which had determined West Berlin as the seat of the office, led to official protests by the GDR State Department the following day.

After the dissolution of the Federal Health Office (1994), the Institute for Water, Floor and Air Hygiene (Wabolu) was integrated into the Federal Environment Agency.

Relocation of the office seat 
On May 2, 2005, the office of the Federal Environment Office was relocated to Dessau-Roßlau (at that time still Dessau); A second branch remained in the original building on Bismarckplatz in Berlin.

President 
President of the Federal Environment Agency was the lawyer Heinrich von Lersner from the foundation in 1974 to 1995, the economist Andreas Troge from 1995 to 2009 as well as the economist and long -time president of the Nature Conservation Association of Germany (NABU) Jochen Flasbarth from 2009 to December 2013. In May 2014, Maria Krautzberger appointed a president for the first time. On January 1, 2020, Professor Dirk Messner took the office of President of the Federal Environment Agency.

Organization 
The authority has around 1,600 employees and institutions in Dessau-Roßlau, Berlin, Bad Elster and Langen. In addition, the UBA operates seven -distributed measurement stations for measuring the background concentrations of aerial ingredients: (Westerland, Zingst, Waldhof (Lüneburger Heide), Neuglobsow, Schmücke, Schauinsland, Zugspitze).

The UBA is divided into the following units:
 Central area (administrative control and service)
 Department I (environmental planning and sustainability strategies)
 Department II (health environmental protection, protection of ecosystems)
 Department III (sustainable production and products, circular economy)
 Department IV (chemical security)
 Department V (climate protection, energy, German emissions trade (DEECHT))
 Presidential area

The UBA has its headquarters in Dessau and at its branch offices in Berlin (Grunewald or City Campus by 2025/26  and Marienfelde), Langen and Bad Elster via an environmental management system (UMS) according to the specifications of the ECO Management and Audit Scheme.

Jurisdiction 
In accordance with the Basic Law, the responsibilities between the federal and state governments are distributed. In some areas, environmental protection is a federal dessert and in other areas he only has the authority of the framework legislation for the federal states. Therefore, some tasks of environmental protection are performed by the Federal Environment Agency by the state offices responsible for the environment in the federal states.

Federation reform I have partially led to a new distribution of the legislative skills between the federal and state governments in the environmental area. The most important changes are:
 Completion of the necessity clause in the areas of waste management, air pollution control and noise control and thus facilitated legislation of the federal government
 Nuclear law: now exclusive legislative competence of the federal government
 Hunting, nature conservation and landscape maintenance, spatial planning, water balance: abolition of the framework competence of the federal government, now competing legislative competence, but certain deviation rights of the federal states
 Environmentally relevant procedural law: Responsibility of the federal government with the consent of the Federal Council; If the consent is missing, the countries may differ.

The federal government now has the competence of issuing directly effective regulations in many areas of environmental law and thus implementing European law, for example, promptly and uniformly; In certain areas, the countries have deviation rights and sometimes also scope for design. The Federal Environment Agency is responsible for the implementation of the regulations. This includes the summary of the reports from the EU guidelines from the federal states and the forwarding to the responsible European authorities, such as the European Environment Agency.

Further tasks 
In addition to internal research, including in its own laboratories, the Federal Environment Agency also awards research orders to scientific institutions and institutes.

To support its work, the Federal Environment Agency uses various scientific commissions in which external experts are represented and the Federal Environment Agency is professionally advised. The commissions include:
 Commission Assessment of water -hazardous substances (KBWS)
 Commission soil protection
 Commission Human Biomonitoring
 Commission interior air hygiene (IRK)
 Commission Agriculture at the Federal Environment Agency (Klu)
 Swimming and swimming pool commission (BWK) 
 Drinking water commission
 Resource commission

Furthermore, the
 Specialist advisory board floor investigations

Other 
Federal Environmental Office in 2007 offers or promotes the Federal Environment Agency a CO2 computer with which the personal carbon dioxide balance can be calculated.  The computer offers an overview of the current personal CO2 footprint, the central set screws (so-called "Big Points") and what contribution could be made for climate protection in the future.

References

External links

Official English website

Environmental agencies in Germany